Absolute monarchy is a form of monarchy in which the monarch rules in their own right or power. In an absolute monarchy, the king or queen is by no means limited and has absolute power, though a limited constitution may exist in some countries. These are often hereditary monarchies. On the other hand, in constitutional monarchies, in which the authority of the head of state is also bound or restricted by the constitution, a legislature, or unwritten customs, the king or queen is not the only one to decide, and their entourage also exercises power, mainly the prime minister.

Absolute monarchy in Europe declined substantially following the French Revolution and World War I, both of which led to the popularization of theories of government based on the notion of popular sovereignty.

Absolute monarchies include Brunei, Eswatini, Oman, Saudi Arabia, Vatican City, and the individual emirates composing the United Arab Emirates, which itself is a federation of such monarchies – a federal monarchy.

Historical examples of absolute monarchies

Outside Europe 

In the Ottoman Empire, the Sultan wielded absolute power over the state and was considered a Padishah meaning "Great King" by his people. Many sultans wielded absolute power through heavenly mandates reflected in their title, such as "Shadow of God on Earth". In ancient Mesopotamia, many rulers of Assyria, Babylonia and Sumer were absolute monarchs as well.

Throughout Imperial China, many emperors and one empress (Wu Zetian) wielded absolute power through the Mandate of Heaven. In pre-Columbian America, the Inca Empire was ruled by a Sapa Inca, who was considered the son of Inti, the sun god and absolute ruler over the people and nation. Korea under the Joseon dynasty and short-lived empire was also an absolute monarchy.

Europe
Throughout much of European history, the divine right of kings was the theological justification for absolute monarchy. Many European monarchs claimed supreme autocratic power by divine right, and that their subjects had no rights to limit their power.

Throughout the Age of Enlightenment, the concept of the divine right to power and democratic ideals were given serious merit.

The Revolutions of 1848, known in some countries as the Springtime of the Peoples or the Springtime of Nations, were a series of political upheavals throughout Europe in 1848. It remains the most widespread revolutionary wave in European history. By the 19th century, divine right was regarded as an obsolete theory in most countries in the Western world, except in Russia where it was still given credence as the official justification for the Tsar's power until February Revolution in 1917 and in the Vatican City where it remains today.

Kingdoms of England and Scotland
James VI and I and his son Charles I tried to import the principle of divine right into Scotland and England. Charles I's attempt to enforce episcopal polity on the Church of Scotland led to rebellion by the Covenanters and the Bishops' Wars, then fears that Charles I was attempting to establish absolutist government along European lines was a major cause of the English Civil War, despite the fact that he did rule this way for 11 years starting in 1629, after dissolving the Parliament of England for a time.

Denmark–Norway

Absolutism was underpinned by a written constitution for the first time in Europe in 1665  of Denmark–Norway, which ordered that the Monarch:  This law consequently authorized the king to abolish all other centers of power. Most important was the abolition of the Council of the Realm in Denmark. Absolute monarchy lasted until 1814 in Norway, and 1848 in Denmark.

Habsburgs

Hungary

France

Louis XIV of France (1638–1715) is often said to have proclaimed . Although often criticized for his extravagances, such as the Palace of Versailles, he reigned over France for a long period, some historians consider him an absolute monarch, while some other historians have questioned whether Louis' reign should be considered 'absolute', given the reality of the balance of power between the monarch and the nobility, as well as parliaments.

The king of France concentrated legislative, executive, and judicial powers in his person. He was the supreme judicial authority. He could condemn people to death without the right of appeal. It was both his duty to punish offenses and stop them from being committed. From his judicial authority followed his power both to make laws and to annul them.

Prussia

In Brandenburg-Prussia, the concept of absolute monarch took a notable turn from the above with its emphasis on the monarch as the "first servant of the state", but it also echoed many of the important characteristics of absolutism. Frederick William (r. 1640–1688), known as the Great Elector, used the uncertainties of the final stages of the Thirty Years' War to consolidate his territories into the dominant kingdom in northern Germany, whilst increasing his power over his subjects. His actions largely originated the militaristic streak of the Hohenzollerns.

Frederick William enjoyed support from the nobles, who enabled the Great Elector to undermine the Diet of Brandenburg and other representative assemblies. The leading families saw their future in cooperation with the central government and worked to establish absolutist power.

The most significant indicator of the nobles' success was the establishment of two tax rates – one for the cities and the other for the countryside – to the great advantage of the latter, which the nobles ruled. The nobles served in the upper levels of the elector's army and bureaucracy, but they also won new prosperity for themselves. The support of the Elector enabled the imposition of serfdom and the consolidation of land holdings into vast estates which provided for their wealth.

They became known as Junkers (from the German for young lord, junger Herr). Frederick William faced resistance from representative assemblies and long-independent cities in his realm. City leaders often revolted at the imposition of Electorate authority. The last notable effort was the uprising of the city of Königsberg which allied with the Estates General of Prussia to refuse to pay taxes. Frederick William crushed this revolt in 1662, by marching into the city with thousands of troops. A similar approach was used with the towns of Cleves.

Russia

Until 1905, the Tsars and Emperors of Russia governed as absolute monarchs. Ivan the Terrible was known for his reign of terror through oprichnina. Peter I the Great reduced the power of the Russian nobility and strengthened the central power of the monarch, establishing a bureaucracy and a police state. This tradition of absolutism, known as Tsarist autocracy, was expanded by Catherine II the Great and her descendants. Although Alexander II made some reforms and established an independent judicial system, Russia did not have a representative assembly or a constitution until the 1905 Revolution. However, the concept of absolutism was so ingrained in Russia that the Russian Constitution of 1906 still described the monarch as an autocrat. Russia became the last European country (excluding Vatican City) to abolish absolutism, and it was the only one to do so as late as the 20th century (the Ottoman Empire drafted its first constitution in 1876).

Sweden

The form of government instituted in Sweden under King Charles XI and passed on to his son, Charles XII is commonly referred to as absolute monarchy; however, the Swedish monarch was never absolute in the sense that he wielded arbitrary power. The monarch still ruled under the law and could only legislate in agreement with the Riksdag of the Estates; rather, the absolutism introduced was the monarch's ability to run the government unfettered by the privy council, contrary to earlier practice. The absolute rule of Charles XI was instituted by the crown and the Riksdag in order to carry out the Great Reduction which would have been made impossible by the privy council which comprised the high nobility.

After the death of Charles XII in 1718, the system of absolute rule was largely blamed for the ruination of the realm in the Great Northern War, and the reaction tipped the balance of power to the other extreme end of the spectrum, ushering in the Age of Liberty. After half a century of largely unrestricted parliamentary rule proved just as ruinous, King Gustav III seized back royal power in the coup d'état of 1772, and later once again abolished the privy council under the Union and Security Act in 1789, which, in turn, was rendered void in 1809 when Gustav IV Adolf was deposed in a coup and the constitution of 1809 was put in its place. The years between 1789 and 1809, then, are also referred to as a period of absolute monarchy.

Contemporary trends
Many nations formerly with absolute monarchies, such as Jordan, Kuwait, and Morocco, have moved towards constitutional monarchy. However, in these cases the monarch still retains tremendous power, even to the extent that by some measures, parliament's influence on political life is viewed as negligible.

In Bhutan, the government moved from absolute monarchy to constitutional monarchy following planned parliamentary elections to the Tshogdu in 2003, and the election of a National Assembly in 2008.

Nepal had several swings between constitutional rule and direct rule related to the Nepalese Civil War, the Maoist insurgency, and the 2001 Nepalese royal massacre, with the Nepalese monarchy being abolished on 28 May 2008.

In Tonga, the king had majority control of the Legislative Assembly until 2010.

Liechtenstein has moved towards expanding the power of the monarch: the Prince of Liechtenstein was given expanded powers after a referendum amending the Constitution of Liechtenstein in 2003, which led the BBC to describe the prince as an "absolute monarch again".

Current absolute monarchies

Saudi Arabia 
Saudi Arabia is an absolute monarchy, and according to the Basic Law of Saudi Arabia adopted by Royal Decree in 1992, the King must comply with Shari'a (Islamic law) and the Qur'an. The Qur'an and the body of the Sunnah (traditions of the Islamic prophet, Muhammad) are declared to be the Kingdom's Constitution, but no written modern constitution has ever been promulgated for Saudi Arabia, which remains the only Arab nation where no national elections have ever taken place since its founding. No political parties or national elections are permitted and according to The Economist's 2010 Democracy Index, the Saudi government is the eighth most authoritarian regime from among the 167 countries rated.

Scholarship
There is a considerable variety of opinion by historians on the extent of absolutism among European monarchs. Some, such as Perry Anderson, argue that quite a few monarchs achieved levels of absolutist control over their states, while historians such as Roger Mettam dispute the very concept of absolutism.  In general, historians who disagree with the appellation of absolutism argue that most monarchs labeled as absolutist exerted no greater power over their subjects than any other non-absolutist rulers, and these historians tend to emphasize the differences between the absolutist rhetoric of monarchs and the realities of the effective use of power by these absolute monarchs.  Renaissance historian William Bouwsma summed up this contradiction:

Anthropology, sociology, and ethology as well as various other disciplines such as political science attempt to explain the rise of absolute monarchy ranging from extrapolation generally, to certain Marxist explanations in terms of the class struggle as the underlying dynamic of human historical development generally and absolute monarchy in particular.

In the 17th century, French legal theorist Jean Domat defended the concept of absolute monarchy in works such as "On Social Order and Absolute Monarchy", citing absolute monarchy as preserving natural order as God intended. Other intellectual figures who supported absolute monarchy include Thomas Hobbes and Charles Maurras.

See also

 Autocracy
 Authoritarianism
 Constitutional monarchy
 Criticism of monarchy
 Democracy
 Despotism
 Dictatorship
 Enlightened absolutism
 Jacques Bossuet
 Monarchomachs
 Presidential system
 Theonomy
 Thomas Hobbes
 Totalitarianism
 Tyranny

Footnotes

References

Further reading
 Anderson, Perry. (1961, 1974). Lineages of the Absolutist State. London: Verso.
 Beloff, Max. The Age of Absolutism 1660-1815.
 Blum, Jerome, et al. (1970). The European World, vol 1, pp 267–466.
 Blum, Jerome, et al. (1951). Lord and Peasant in Russia from the Ninth to the Nineteenth Century. Princeton, NJ: Princeton University Press.
 Kimmel, Michael S. (1988). Absolutism and Its Discontents: State and society in seventeenth-century France and England.  New Brunswick, NJ: Transaction Books.
 Méttam, Roger. (1988). Power and Faction in Louis XIV's France. New York: Blackwell Publishers.
 Miller, John (ed.) (1990). Absolutism in Seventeenth-Century Europe.  New York: Palgrave Macmillan.
 Wilson, Peter H. (2000). Absolutism in Central Europe. New York: Routledge.
 Zmohra, Hillay. (2001). Monarchy, Aristocracy, and the State in Europe – 1300–1800.  New York: Routledge.

Monarchy
Political theories